The Red Bridge (Karmir kamurj; also known as the Old Bridge of Hrazdan; and also known as Bridge of Khoja Plav, Khoja Plavi kamurj) is a ruined 17th-century bridge on the Hrazdan River, in Yerevan, Armenia.

It was called ‘red’ because as it is built of red tuff. The bridge was also called "Khoja-plav bridge" for Khoja-plav, a wealthy man from Kanaker who financed its reconstructruction.

The total length of the bridge was 80 meters and its height was 11 meters. It had 4 arches. Two were in the middle and were squiggly, the other two arches were on the banks of the Hrazdan River.

Before the 1679 earthquake there was a bridge in the same place but it was ruined by the earthquake. It provided economic connections between the Yerevan Fortress (in place of the Yerevan Ararat Wine Factory) and the Ararat Plain.

Gallery
Historic pictures of the bridge 

Remnants of the bridge

References

  Tadevos Hakobyan; ԵՐԵՎԱՆԻ ՊԱՏՄՈՒԹՅՈՒՆԸ (1500–1800 ԹԹ.) (History of Yerevan (1500-1800), 1971, Publishing of YSU, p. 373

Bridges in Yerevan
1679 establishments in Iran
Road bridges in Armenia